Diabantia is a genus of praying mantises in the family Thespidae. It is monotypic, being represented by the single species, Diabantia minima.

See also
List of mantis genera and species

References

External links
Diabantia at Tree of Life

Thespidae
Insects of Asia
Mantodea genera